São Roque do Faial is a parish in the municipality of Santana on the island of Madeira. The population in 2011 was 736, in an area of 15.61 km2. It is located 3 km southeast of Santana.

Administrative Districts 

 Achada do Cedro Gordo
 Achada do Folhadal
 Cancela 
 Chão do Cedro Gordo
 Fajã do Cedro Gordo
 Lombo Grande
 Lombo dos Palheiros
 Pico do Cedro Gordo
 Ribeiro Frio
 Serradinho
 Terreiros

References

Freguesias of Santana, Madeira